Yaminjeongeum is a South Korean internet meme which disassembles Hangul characters of a word and replaces them with others which appear similar to the correct form. For example,  ("chief") is changed into , since  (대) resembles  (머).

Origin 
There is no definitive source of the origin of Yaminjeongeum. According to DC wiki, a wiki of DC Inside, it was slang girls used in the 2000s.

Use 
There are various ways to convert a word into yaminjeongeum: just replacing its consonants or vowels, rotating it, compacting it, or even using Latin alphabet. Some word plays are often considered as Yaminjeongeum, though they existed before it. There is no standard of the meme, only popular forms. The following are some common examples of it:

Popularity 
In early days, Yaminjeongeum was only used in DC Inside, but it has spread to other South Korean internet communities such as Namuwiki. Now it is commonly used in public, especially by teens, and even appears on TV ad. Google Translate translates some Yaminjeongum correctly.

Criticism 
Critics state that the meme destroys Hangul and is a type of verbal violence, but supporters state that it is just a part of culture and improves the Korean language.

See also
 Transcription error, unintentional misreading.

References

External links 

 '야민정음' subject in DC wiki:
 Yaminjeongum subject (written in it)
 Translated version of the subject
 Yaminjeongum Haerye (parody of Hunminjeongeum Haerye)

Internet memes
Hangul
Nonstandard spelling
Language games